Bart Nieuwkoop (born 7 March 1996) is a Dutch professional footballer who plays as a right back for Belgian Pro League club Union SG.

Career
Nieuwkoop is a youth exponent from Feyenoord. He made his team debut on 4 October 2015 against De Graafschap starting in the first eleven and was replaced after 68 minutes by Tonny Vilhena.

On 30 April 2021, it was announced that Nieuwkoop had signed a three-year contract with Union Saint-Gilloise, recently promoted to the Belgian First Division A.

Career statistics

Club

Honours
Feyenoord
 Eredivisie: 2016–17
 KNVB Cup: 2015–16, 2017–18
Johan Cruijff Shield: 2017, 2018

Union SG
 Belgian First Division A Runner-up: 2021–22

References

External links
 
 

1996 births
Living people
Sportspeople from Bergen op Zoom
Association football midfielders
Dutch footballers
Netherlands youth international footballers
Eredivisie players
Belgian Pro League players
Feyenoord players
Willem II (football club) players
Royale Union Saint-Gilloise players
Dutch expatriate footballers
Expatriate footballers in Belgium
Dutch expatriate sportspeople in Belgium
Footballers from North Brabant